Louisa Motha was co-ordinator of the Abahlali baseMjondolo movement for a number of years beginning in 2004. She lives in the Motala Heights shack settlement in Pinetown near the city of Durban in South Africa.

Motha became friends with fellow activist Shamita Naidoo when they met washing their clothes in the river.

She is particularly well known for organising against evictions and was a strong critic of the Slums Act. She also started a women's gardening group called the Motola Diggers.

References

External links
Photo Essay on Motala Heights by Antonios Vradis
A Place in the City, by Jenny Mogan, 2008

Living people
South African activists
South African women activists
Shack dwellers
Year of birth missing (living people)
21st-century squatters
Squatter leaders
Abahlali baseMjondolo members